Nickel oxide hydroxide is the inorganic compound with the chemical formula NiO(OH). It is a black solid that is insoluble in all solvents but attacked by base and acid. It is a component of the nickel-metal hydride battery and of the nickel–iron battery.

Related materials
Nickel(III) oxides are often poorly characterized and are assumed to be nonstoichiometric compounds. Nickel(III) oxide (Ni2O3) has not been verified crystallographically. For applications in organic chemistry, nickel oxides or peroxides are generated in situ and lack crystallographic characterization. For example, "nickel peroxide" (CAS# 12035-36-8) is also closely related to or even identical with NiO(OH).

Synthesis and structure
Its layered structure resembles that of the brucite polymorph of nickel(II) hydroxide, but with half as many hydrogens. The oxidation state of nickel is 3+. It can be prepared by the reaction of nickel(II) hydroxide with aqueous potassium hydroxide and bromine as the oxidant:
 2 Ni(OH)2 + 2 KOH + Br2  →  2 KBr + 2 H2O + 2 NiOOH

Use in organic chemistry
Nickel(III) oxides catalyze the oxidation of benzyl alcohol to benzoic acid using bleach:

Similarly it catalyzes the double oxidation of 3-butenoic acid to fumaric acid:

References

Inorganic compounds
Catalysts
Electrochemistry
Nickel compounds
Non-stoichiometric compounds
Transition metal oxides